The Wrobel Vroby 2 is a French powered parachute that was designed by Gerard Wrobel and produced by Wrobel of Beynes, Alpes-de-Haute-Provence. Now out of production, when it was available the aircraft was supplied as a complete ready-to-fly-aircraft.

Design and development
It features a  parachute-style wing, two-seats-in-tandem accommodation in an open-frame structure, tricycle landing gear and a single cylinder  Zanzottera MZ 34 engine in pusher configuration.

The aircraft carriage is built from 4130 steel tubing. In flight steering is accomplished via handles that actuate the canopy brakes, creating roll and yaw. On the ground the aircraft has lever-controlled nosewheel steering. The main landing gear incorporates triangulated spring rod suspension.

Reviewer Jean-Pierre le Camus, writing in 2003, described the design as "carefully constructed".

Specifications (Vroby 2)

References

Vroby 2
2000s French sport aircraft
2000s French ultralight aircraft
Powered parachutes
Single-engined pusher aircraft